Rapid eye movement sleep behaviour disorder and Parkinson’s disease is rapid eye movement sleep behavior disorder (RBD) that is associated with Parkinson's disease. RBC is linked genetically and neuropathologically to α- synuclein, a presynaptic neuronal protein that exerts deleterious effects on neighbouring proteins, leading to neuronal death. This pathology is linked to numerous other neurodegenerative disorders, such as Lewy bodies dementia, and collectively these disorders are known as synucleinopathies. Numerous reports over the past few years have stated the frequent association of synucleinopathies with REM sleep behaviour disorder (RBD). In particular, the frequent association of RBD with Parkinson’s. In the general population the incidence of RBD is around 0.5%, compared to the prevalence of RBD in PD patients, which has been reported to be between 38% to 60%. The diagnosis and symptom onset of RBD typically precedes the onset of motor or cognitive symptoms of PD by a number of years, typically ranging anywhere from 2 to 15 years prior. Hence, this link could provide an important window of opportunity in the implementation of therapies and treatments, that could prevent or slow the onset of PD.

Parkinson's disease 

Parkinson's disease (PD) is a progressive neurodegenerative disorder that affects dopaminergic cells, predominantly in the substantia nigra, a region of the midbrain. Dopamine is a neurotransmitter implicated in motivation, memory and in the initiation and fluidity of movement. It is the death of dopaminergic cells within a PD brain that creates a dopamine deficit, creating the identifiable clinical symptoms, such as; tremor, Bradykinesia, gait and balance problems, and limb rigidity. The appearance of these clinical symptoms usually occurs in the later stages of the disease, when around 80% of the dopaminergic cells have died. The cause of this cell death is still poorly understood, but research shows the involvement of Lewy body pathology within affected neurons. Braak et al, proposed various stages of PD in relation to the spreading of this Lewy body pathology through neurological structures. The type and severity of clinical symptoms correlates to the progression through the outlined 6 Braak stages, with early stages characterized by non-motor symptoms, mid stages characterized by motor symptoms and cognitive symptoms arising in the later stages.

REM sleep behaviour disorder 

Rapid eye movement sleep behavior disorder (RBD) is a sleep disorder characterized by the loss of normal skeletal muscle atonia during REM sleep and is associated with prominent motor activity and vivid dreaming. Dream enactment behaviour is a core feature of RBD but is not an exclusive marker of the disorder, therefore a history of recurrent dream enacting behaviour only enough to receive a diagnosis of ‘clinically probable RBD’ and the diagnosis of 'definite RBD' is only given when there is polysomnography confirmation of complex motor behaviour during REM sleep. When RBD occurs in the absence of any known aetiology of the disorder it is referred to as ‘idiopathic’, however when RBD arises in relation to another neurological disorder or neurodegenerative disease, it is referred to as ‘secondary’ or ‘symptomatic’ RBD.

Cognitive Phenotype of PD with RBD 
Amongst research on the link between RBD and PD, a specific cognitive phenotype of PD has emerged. This phenotype is classified as 'diffuse malignant' and is associated with faster cognitive decline/ more severe cognitive impairment. It has a much poorer prognosis and increases and those with this phenotype have an increased likelihood of going on to develop some form of dementia.

When observing both cross-sectional and longitudinal data regarding RBD and PD, deficits in global cognitive functioning, attention/working memory, language, executive functions, and visuospatial abilities can be seen in patients with RBD and PD (PDRBD); especially in comparison to PD patients without RBD (PD non-RBD). PDRBD show significantly greater annual rates of decline on established cognitive tests such as the MoCA test, and even have an increased likelihood of displaying clinical manifestations that have a strong link to PD dementia, for example visual hallucinations.

Patients with PDRBD report much higher subjective rates of cognitive decline compared to those without RBD and are much more likely to be diagnosed with mild cognitive impairment (MCI). On average 75%-80% of patients with PDRBD go onto receive a diagnosis of MCI, and then a further 30% develop some form of dementia, within 15–20 years of PD onset.

The difference in overall cognitive decline between PDRBD and PD non-RBD is replicated in studies conducted in many different cultures and remains strong regardless of whether participants are drug naïve or taking some form of dopaminergic treatment to aid with their PD. However, the existence of a unique and specific cognitively impaired profile among PD patients with RBD is still deemed controversial. This is mainly due to methodological limitations among the literature; such as the absence of polysomnography in the diagnosis of RBD, the use of tests with poor sensitivity when measuring cognition and testing for cognitive deficits, as well as small sample sizes. Despite this, many researchers do still advocate for the use of RBD as a premature clinical indicator of PD, which could provide an earlier window for potential preventative treatment of PD.

Neuropathology of RBD in PD 
There are a number of proposed explanations put forth by researchers to try and explain the cognitively impaired phenotype of PD that is linked to RBD. The first is that RBD affects sleep quality/content, which in turn could lead to cognitive dysfunction through various neuronal mechanisms. However, there is not much research support for this idea and there is a lack of association between different sleep disorders, such as insomnia, and cognitive decline in PD.

Another proposed explanation for the increased cognitive decline seen in PDRBD, is due to alterations in neurotransmitter systems. In particular, greater cholinergicdenervation in PD patients with RBD compared to those without. This difference is seen particularly in brain structures like the basal forebrain, an area implicated in both cognition and the regulation of REM sleep and muscle tone through interactions with brainstem nuclei. The increased cholinergic denervation is proposed to appear in the third phase of Braak staging, in which Lewy body pathology in a PD brain appears in the basal forebrain and is thought to cause the reduction in cholinergic neurotransmitters. Thus, cholinergic reduction could play a key role in the pathogenesis of RBD in PD and the cognitive impairment found in these patients, making this a potential marker for a specific cognitive subset of PD. This hypothesis is supported by the amelioration of RBD symptoms through the use of acetylcholinesterase inhibitors, drugs which lead to an increase in cholinergic neurotransmitters in the brain.

A reduction in grey matter volume and cortical thinning, especially in the frontal cortex and inferior parietal lobe of the brain, have also been proposed as the potential cause of PDRBD. Due to the link of cortical and subcortical brain regions in these areas with cognition and REM sleep. The left insular cortex in particular has shown much greater levels of cortical thinning in PDRBD compared to PD without RBD. An area of the brain considered an ‘integrating hub’ of higher-level cognitive processes with social-emotional and sensorimotor functioning. However, there are a lot of inconsistent results within the literature surrounding differences in grey matter volume, and so alterations in brain matter volume are seen as a less reliable neurological marker.

References 

Parkinson's disease
Sleep disorders
Neuropathology